Laurelwood may refer to:

a common name for Lauraceae
Laurelwood Academy, a school near Eugene, Oregon, United States
Laurelwood, Oregon, a community in Washington County, Oregon, United States
Laurelwood Historic District, a historic district in Roseburg, Oregon, United States 
Laurelwood Pub and Brewery, a brewpub in Oregon, United States
Laurelwood Elementary School, a school in the Evergreen Elementary School District in California, United States
Laurelwood, a ship renamed the RFA Cherryleaf
Laurelwood (Columbia, South Carolina), listed on the NRHP in South Carolina
 Laurelwood the original name of Studio City, California area.